The 2011–12 Phoenix Coyotes season was the franchise's 33rd season in the National Hockey League (NHL), their 40th overall and the 16th in Phoenix, Arizona.

Off-season 

On May 10, 2011, the Glendale City Council voted (by a 5–2 count) to keep the Coyotes in Arizona for the 2011–12 season on an interim basis while it tried to find a new owner to keep the team in Glendale. Before this vote, there was widespread speculation that the team would be re-locating back to Winnipeg before the start of the 2011–12 NHL season. Potential owner Matthew Hulsizer ended his bid to purchase the Coyotes on June 27, leaving no current potential buyers of the team, once again leaving the Coyotes' future in question.

Pending free agent goaltender Ilya Bryzgalov was traded to the Philadelphia Flyers prior to the start of free agency.

The Coyotes ended their minor-league affiliation with the San Antonio Rampage and signed an affiliation with the Portland Pirates.

Regular season 
The Coyotes finished with their third straight 90-point season, with 97 points.  On April 7, 2012, the Coyotes defeated the Minnesota Wild with a score of 4–1 to win the Pacific Division title—their first division title as an NHL team.

Playoffs

As Pacific Division champions, the Coyotes were the third seed in the Western Conference. They faced the Chicago Blackhawks in the first round, and defeated them in six games for the franchise's first playoff series win since 1987, when as the Winnipeg Jets, they defeated the Calgary Flames in the first round. The Coyotes defeated the fourth-seeded Nashville Predators in five games to advance to the first Western Conference Final in franchise history. The eighth-seeded Los Angeles Kings knocked the Coyotes out of the playoffs in five games.

Standings

Schedule and results

Pre-season

Regular season

Playoffs
Key:  Win  Loss

Player statistics

Skaters

Goaltenders 

†Denotes player spent time with another team before joining Coyotes. Stats reflect time with the Coyotes only.
‡Traded mid-season.
Bold/italics denotes franchise record.

Awards and records

Awards

Records

Milestones

Transactions 
The Coyotes have been involved in the following transactions during the 2011–12 season.

Trades

Free agents acquired

Free agents lost

Claimed via waivers

Lost via waivers

Player signings

Draft picks 
Phoenix's picks at the 2011 NHL Entry Draft in St. Paul, Minnesota.

See also 
 2011–12 NHL season
 Phoenix Coyotes bankruptcy

References 

Arizona Coyotes seasons
P
P